Ḥāfiẓ Aḥmad Jaunpūrī (1834 – 26 January 1899) was an Indian Muslim scholar, religious preacher and social worker. As the son and successor of Karamat Ali Jaunpuri, he led the Taiyuni reformist movement in Bengal.

Early life and family 
Ahmad Jaunpuri was born in 1834, in the city of Calcutta, Bengal Presidency, to an Indian Muslim family that traced their ancestry to the Arab tribe of Quraysh. He was the 36th direct descendant of Abu Bakr, the first Rashidun caliph. His father, Karamat Ali Jaunpuri, migrated from Jaunpur in North India with the intention of reforming the Muslims of Bengal. Ahmad Jaunpuri's paternal grandfather, Abu Ibrahim Shaykh Muhammad Imam Bakhsh was a student of Shah Abdul Aziz, and his great-grandfather Jarullah was also a shaykh.

Ahmad Jaunpuri completed his memorisation of the Qur'an at an early age, which led to him earning the title of Hafiz. He proceeded to gained more knowledge in Islamic studies in Lucknow and Jaunpur. Many of his family members were also Islamic scholars, for example, his youngest brother Abdul Awwal Jaunpuri.

Career 
He established numerous madrasas and an eidgah in Daulatkhan in Bhola Island. He also provided black seed oil treatment to the locals. He represented the Taiyunis at a debate in 1879 in Madaripur against the Faraizis on the topic of the permissibility of the Friday prayer in British India. The Faraizis discarded Friday and Eid prayers as they considered British India as a Dar al-Harb (house of war). Over five thousand people attended this event and it was dubbed by Nabinchandra Sen as the Battle of Jumuʿah. In 1881, Nawab Abdul Latif gained permission for Jaunpuri to lead the Eid prayer at the Maidan of Calcutta. Over 70,000 Muslims joined the congregation, making it the largest gathering in Calcutta. He wrote a book on Hajera.

Jaunpuri had a cordial relationship with Munshi Mohammad Meherullah.

He set off to complete Hajj in 1882. During his stay in the Hejaz, he gained a great reception and was acclaimed as an orator. He brought up his nephew Abdur Rab Jaunpuri, and Yaqub Badarpuri of Sylhet was also his murid and one of his khalifahs (successors). Another successor was Abdul Latif Taluqdar of Mirsarai.

Death 
Hafiz Ahmad Jaunpuri died on 26 January 1899 in Sadarghat, Dacca. He was buried just south of the Chawkbazar Shahi Mosque in Old Dhaka. His biography was written by his nephew Abdul Batin Jaunpuri.

Spiritual genealogy 
 Prophet Muhammad
 Abū Bakr
 Salmān al-Fārisī
 Al-Qāsim bin Muḥammad 
 Jaʿfar aṣ-Ṣādiq
 Abū Yazīd Ṭayfūr al-Bisṭāmī
 Abu al-Ḥasan ʿAlī al-Kharaqānī
 Abū ʿAlī Faḍl Farmadī
 Abū Yaʿqūb Yūsuf al-Hamadānī
 ʿAbd al-Khāliq Ghijdawānī
 Muḥammad ʿĀrif Riwgarī
 Maḥmūd Anjīr Faghnawī
 ʿAzīzān ʿAlī Rāmitānī
 Sayyid Amīr Kulāl
 Muḥammad Bābā as-Samāsī
 Sayyid Bahā ad-Dīn Naqshband
 Sayyid Mīr ʿAlā ad-Dīn ʿAṭṭār
 Yaʿqūb Charkhī
 Khwājah ʿUbaydullāh Aḥrār
 Khwājah Muḥammad Zāhid Wakhshī
 Khwājah Darwesh Muḥammad
 Khwājah Muḥammad Amkingī
 Khwājah Raḍī ad-Dīn Muḥammad Bāqī Billāh
 Aḥmad al-Fārūqī as-Sirhindī
 Sayyid Ādam bin Nūrī
 Sayyid ʿAbdullāh Akbarābādī
 Shāh ʿAbd ar-Raḥīm Dehlawī
 Shāh Walīullāh Dehlawī
 Shāh ʿAbd al-ʿAzīz Dehlawī
 Sayyid Aḥmad Shahīd
 Karāmat ʿAlī Jaunpūrī
 Ḥāfiẓ Aḥmad Jaunpūrī

See also 
Abdul Latif Chowdhury Fultali, his student's student

References 

Indian Muslim scholars of Islam
1834 births
1899 deaths
Indian scholars of Islam
Indian social workers
19th-century Indian educators
19th-century Indian educational theorists
19th-century Indian scholars

Indian revolutionaries
19th-century Indian Muslims
People from Jaunpur district
19th-century Muslim theologians
Sunni Muslim scholars of Islam
Hanafis
Scholars from West Bengal